Simona Andrejić (born 14 August 1994 in Belgrade, is a Serbian top fashion model.

Career
She was the winner of the 2009 Serbian Elite Model Look and she place in top 15 on Elite Model Look International 2009. She speaks Serbian, Russian, English and Spanish language.
Simona has walked the runway for Calvin Klein, Gucci, Chanel, Gianfranco Ferré, Dolce & Gabbana, Christian Dior, Lanvin and others. She shot for Elite model look logo for 2010, NUMERO, Rush and Cosmopolitan.
She has appeared multiple times on the covers of Serbian Elle in 2010, 2011, 2012, 2013, 2014 & 2015, was featured in editorials in Vogue, Numero and many other magazines.

References

External links
FMD profile
Simona Andrejic
Simona-Serbia in
Simona vogue

1994 births
Living people
Models from Belgrade
Serbian female models